is a former district located in the former Sanuki Province (now Kagawa Prefecture) in  Japan.  On March 16, 1899, the district was dissolved by incorporating parts of it into the neighboring Toyota and Mitoyo Districts.

Former districts of Kagawa Prefecture